= 1976 Palauan status negotiations referendum =

September 1976

Results
Choice	Votes	%
Yes	2,780	87.70%
No	390	12.30%
Valid votes	3,170	96.94%
Invalid or blank votes	100	3.06%
Total votes	3,270	100.00%
Registered voters/turnout	3,270	100%

A referendum on holding separate negotiations on its future status was held in the Palau part of the Trust Territory of the Pacific Islands in September 1976. The proposal was approved by 88% of voters.

== Results ==
Choice	Votes	%
For	2,780	87.70
Against	390	12.30
Invalid/blank votes	100	–
Total	3,270	100
Registered voters/turnout		
Source: Direct Democracy
